Arit Okpo is a Nigerian journalist and television host. Okpo is the host CNN International's African Voices Changemakers and former presenter/producer at EbonyLife TV.

Arit is a professional media specialist

Career
Okpo previously worked as a school director in 2013 and later became the creative director of Menoword Media. At EbonyLifeTv, she produced and presented EL Reports (which later became The Crunch), Chefrican and Naija Politics.

CNN
Okpo was announced the new host of CNN African Voices. A CNN International television programme that beams lights on African entertainers, creatives, athletes, and other individuals making a difference in Africa or globally. African Voices is sponsored by Globacom.

References

Oron people
Year of birth missing (living people)
Living people
CNN people
Nigerian women journalists
University of Calabar alumni